Dr R Ravi Kumar graduated from Stanley Medical College and obtained the FRCS from Edinburgh. He worked at the Harefield Hospital, UK, under Sir Magdi Yacoub involving himself with adult cardiac surgery including heart and lung transplant and aortic homografts. Dr Ravi Kumar then underwent surgical residency in Boston, MA, United States. Following this he worked with Dr Albert Starr in Portland, Oregon. He pursued his cardiothoracic residency at the University of Texas, South Western Medical Center, Dallas, Texas, U.S. He continued at the same institution as an advanced fellow in Heart & Lung Transplant and is UNOS (United Nations Organ Sharing), certifiable for Heart & Lung Transplant.

Kumar is a pioneer in Robotic Heart Surgery. He has done varied robotic heart surgical procedures like:  Robotic Mitral Valve Repair/ Replacement, Adult ASD closures, Aortic Valve Replacement, Double Valve Replacement and CABG.  His areas of special interest are, all types of Adult heart surgery, Robotic Assisted Heart Surgery, Pulmonary Thromboendarterectomy for chronic pulmonary thrombo embolic disease, Aortic Aneurysm Repair, Surgery for Cardiac Failure, Heart & Lung Transplant and Ventricular Assist Device.

A surgeon with American Board Certification in General Surgery and Cardiac Surgery who is also UNOS (United Nations Organ Sharing) certifiable for heart and lung transplantation and ventricular assist devices. Kumar's surgical team has, over the past six years outperformed the outcomes of both, The Society of Thoracic Surgeons of Great Britain and Ireland and The Society of Thoracic Surgeons of America. His crude mortality rate is 1.4% for all comers in cardiac surgery as opposed to the above-mentioned societies risk adjusted mortality rates of 2.25%.  In our patient population there were sicker patients (complicated aneurysm surgery, triple valve replacements, cases with severe cardiac dysfunction, combined heart operations, etc. If we risk adjust, then our outcomes will be far superior).

Achievements

World's First Robotic Double Valve Replacement, 2011. 23-year-old male who had chest discomfort, shortness of breath and palpitations for 4 years. Had mitral valve stenosis (shrunk) and regurgitation (leaking) and aortic valve stenosis (shrunk). Had robotic double valve replacement.

World's first Robotic combined Mitral Valve Replacement and CABG, 2011. 66-year-old man with complaints of chest pain and shortness of breath. Patient had coronary artery disease and severe mitral valve leak. Patient had combined robotic mitral valve replacement and coronary artery bypass surgery.

India's first Robotic Aortic Valve Replacement, 2010. 18-year-old patient with complaints of palpitations, chest discomfort, chest pain on exertion. Patient had aortic valve stenosis (shrunk) and regurgitation (leak) with reduced pumping of the heart. He underwent robotic aortic valve replacement.

India's first Robotic Mitral Valve Replacement, 2006. Heart surgeons at CARE Hospital here have replaced the mitral valve in the fist-sized muscular organ of a 23-year-old patient using a robot.

References

External links
 Official website
 Official website on Facebook

Living people
Indian surgeons
Year of birth missing (living people)